Flightless is an Australian independent record label, founded in Melbourne in 2012 by former King Gizzard & the Lizard Wizard member Eric Moore. Originally founded to release both King Gizzard's music and that of associated acts such as The Murlocs, Flightless has since signed other Melbourne-based bands, including Tropical Fuck Storm, Stonefield and Amyl and the Sniffers.

History
Flightless was started in 2012 in Melbourne by drummer Eric Moore as a label for his band King Gizzard & the Lizard Wizard, after he was unsuccessful trying to get the band signed to existing labels. The label's earliest releases were shipped in pizza boxes, and the vinyl runs were small and limited.

In 2015, Flightless hosted the first annual Gizzfest, a music festival featuring bands on the Flightless label as well as others in the psychedelic and garage rock scene. The inaugural festival was held at the Corner Hotel in Melbourne, on 2 and 3 May 2015. The festival returned for the subsequent three years, expanding into a touring festival visiting cities around Australia, including Perth, Brisbane, Sydney, Adelaide and Melbourne. The festival began welcoming international bands such as Mild High Club, Kikagaku Moyo, Altın Gün, and The Mystery Lights to the lineup. The festival took a hiatus in 2019 due to King Gizzard's touring schedule. In 2019 Moore stated that a 2020 iteration of the festival was planned, but due to the COVID-19 pandemic, the festival did not occur.

In 2018, Flightless formed a distribution partnership with ATO Records. The following year, the label opened Flightless 168, a public record store located on Lygon Street in the Melbourne suburb of Brunswick East. 

The Flightless website experienced a major crash on 14 September 2018, following the reissue of King Gizzard & the Lizard Wizard's albums Willoughby's Beach, 12 Bar Bruise, Eyes Like The Sky, Float Along – Fill Your Lungs and Oddments, as well as some promotional merchandise.  The crash was colloquially dubbed 'The Great Flightless Crash' by fans, and resulted in Flightless printing a series of stickers to commemorate it.

In August 2020, founder Eric Moore left King Gizzard & The Lizard Wizard to focus full time on Flightless. In October 2020, King Gizzard & the Lizard Wizard launched their own web store, selling their own independently produced merchandise and vinyl. It is unclear if the band remains officially signed to the label.

March 2021 saw the first annual Flightless Family Folk Festival, a one day festival in Melbourne featuring a mix of Flightless and Non-Flightless folk musicians.

The Flightless 168 store closed its doors in June 2021, preceding the label's move to a new warehouse in Coburg, Australia. The new store, Flightless Factory, opened online in August 2021, with a retail store coming in the future.

Flightless maintains an ethos of environmental friendliness. Since 2019 their vinyl releases have come in cardboard sleeves as an alternative to shrink wrap, with some records produced in an eco-friendly factory through Deepgrooves Vinyl Pressing Plant. Their vinyl shipping mailers feature environmentally friendly messaging, and the label also sells apparel with similar messaging and designs.

Current roster

 Beans (Formerly Baked Beans)
 Bullant
 Eggy
 Leah Senior
 ORB
 Pipe-Eye 
 Stonefield
 The Slingers
 Traffik Island

Alumni
 Amyl and the Sniffers
 Babe Rainbow
 Civic
 Grace Cummings
 King Gizzard & the Lizard Wizard
 Love Migrate
 The Murlocs
 Sleep Decade
 Sagamore

References

External links

Flightless 168

Australian independent record labels
Psychedelic rock record labels
Record labels established in 2012
Record labels based in Melbourne
2012 establishments in Australia